Fourneaux may refer to:

Fourneaux, Loire, a commune in the Loire département, France
Fourneaux, Manche, in the Manche département, France
Fourneaux, Savoie, in the Savoie département, France
Fourneaux-le-Val, in the Calvados département, France
Les Fourneaux, a Premier cru vineyard in Chablis, France

See also 
Furneaux (disambiguation)